, also known as , is a fictional character and the protagonist of the One Piece manga series, created by Eiichiro Oda. Luffy made his debut as a young boy who acquires the properties of rubber after accidentally eating one of the Devil Fruits.

Luffy is the captain of the Straw Hat Pirates, and dreamt of being a pirate since childhood from the influence of his idol and mentor Red-Haired Shanks. At the age of 17, Luffy sets sail from the East Blue Sea to the Grand Line in search of the legendary treasure, One Piece, to succeed Gol D. Roger as "King of the Pirates".

He fights antagonists, and aids and befriends the inhabitants of several islands on his journey. Usually cheerful, he becomes serious and even aggressive when he fights. Luffy uses his elasticity to concentrate his power, executing a range of attacks. In his signature attack, Gum-Gum Pistol, he slingshots punches at opponents from a distance. Luffy also grows stronger over the course of the story, as reflected in his "bounty", which is used to measure the threat he poses to the World Government. He is the grandson of Monkey D. Garp, who is a vice-admiral; the son of Monkey D. Dragon, who is the leader of the Revolutionary Army;, and sworn brother of Portgas D. Ace and Sabo.

Luffy appears in most of the episodes, films, television specials, and OVAs of the manga's anime adaptations and several of the franchise's video games. He is the only character in One Piece who appears in every story arc of the series. Due to the series' international popularity, Luffy is one of the world's most recognizable manga and anime characters. In addition to the One Piece franchise, the character appears in a number of manga and anime series and collaborative video games. His critical reception is largely positive.

Creation and conception

Development
When Eiichiro Oda created Luffy, he strove for a "manliness" similar to that of Akira Toriyama's Dragon Ball series. Oda said that he named his main character "Luffy" because he felt that the name suited him. When he later learned about the sailing term, "luffing", he was delighted by the coincidence. In his prototype one-shot, "Romance Dawn", Oda refined the artistic style and story elements before publishing the final product a year later as the first chapter of One Piece. In the second version of "Romance Dawn", Luffy resembled his design at the beginning of the series. After the one-shot of One Piece was made, Oda contacted his former mentor, Nobuhiro Watsuki, whom he assisted in making the manga Rurouni Kenshin. Watsuki was pleased with Luffy's characterization and advised Oda to briefly change him for the main series to make it look like Luffy is always acting on his own free will. To please his readers, Oda added rubberization to Luffy for comic effect and tries to make the character straightforward. In retrospect, Watsuki felt characters like Luffy reflect a trend of heroes who do not kill their enemies similar to his character Himura Kenshin.

Voice actors
In the original Japanese version of the One Piece  anime series and later spin-offs of the franchise, Luffy is voiced by Mayumi Tanaka. Tanaka said jokingly that she regrets providing Luffy's voice because she is a mother in real life and Luffy is much younger. Asked about her voicing, Tanaka said that she "strives for reality" in scenes where Luffy speaks when he is eating or touching his nose. In the OVA Defeat the Pirate Ganzack!, Luffy was voiced by Urara Takano.

The character was voiced by Erica Schroeder in 4kids Entertainment's English-language dubs of the franchise, starting in 2004, until Funimation acquired the franchise in 2007.

The character is voiced by Colleen Clinkenbeard in Funimation's English-language dubs of the One Piece franchise.

Description
Luffy is usually recognizable by his straw hat, a gift from "Red-Haired" Shanks. In his early childhood, he wears a white shirt and blue shorts. The character has a scar under his left eye from stabbing himself to demonstrate his courage to Shanks and his crew. He later wears a red vest, denim shorts, and sandals, before replacing his vest with a red, unbuttoned sea captain's coat (revealing the X-shaped scar on his chest he received from Akainu), and a yellow sash tied around his waist. Luffy's real-world nationality analogue is Brazilian — Luffy is from the Goa Kingdom, named after an Indian city colonized by the Portuguese Empire. In the Netflix adaptation, Luffy will be portrayed by Iñaki Godoy, a Mexican actor.

Personality
Luffy is portrayed as a carefree, fun-loving, happy-go-lucky character with great ambition and a huge appetite, often thinking with his stomach and comically gorging himself. Optimistic and generally good-hearted, he is not as dimwitted as many believe him to be, and he often demonstrates more understanding than the other characters expect. Knowing the danger ahead, Luffy is willing to risk his life to become King of the Pirates and protect his crew. A capable and reliable captain, he never puts his crew or himself at risk out of incompetence. During the Loguetown story arc, Smoker (a navy captain at the time) says that Luffy "enjoys playing stupid"; Luffy responds with a mysterious smile.

He enlists Chopper and Brook for his crew not just for their personality or appearance, but also because of his instinctive ability to read people. Luffy needs key jobs filled by his crew (cook, navigator, medic, musician, and shipwright, filled by Sanji, Nami, Chopper, Brook, and Franky, respectively). At the beginning of the series, he said that he wanted at least ten crew members with abilities he felt necessary for his goal. Despite his carefree personality, each crew member respects him in their own way. Luffy is rarely concerned about the consequences of his actions, doing what he feels is right at the moment, even if it leads to retaliation by a powerful force. He is an extremely loyal captain, who has demonstrated throughout the series that he is willing to risk his life for the well-being of his crew.

Abilities

Devil Fruit
Luffy's rubberiness is a result of eating a devil fruit called the Gum-Gum Fruit. It makes him immune to electric attacks and most blunt forces, also giving him the ability to stretch his body at will. He uses his elasticity to accelerate part or all of his body to deliver punches, kicks, head butts, and body checks or for propulsion. Like others exposed to Devil Fruit, Luffy cannot swim; when he is submerged in water or contacts the Sea-Prism Stone, he loses his strength and cannot move on his own. In addition to his Devil Fruit powers, he has immense strength, durability, speed, reflexes, agility, endurance, and stamina.

Observing CP9's  technique, Luffy adapts the move to his rubber body and matches the assassins' speed. , another technique, uses air in his bones to attack but makes him shrink afterward. Luffy can use both techniques simultaneously; after two years, he gains better control of the techniques and is no longer affected by their drawbacks.

Luffy develops another technique,  (similar to Third Gear), inflating his muscles to increase the size of his limbs (except for his legs). He can make destructive moves by compressing and releasing his limbs, and can fly in a similar fashion to CP9's  technique.

Later, it is revealed that the Gum-Gum Fruit's real name is the "Human-Human Fruit, Model: Nika". It is a Mythical Zoan-type Devil Fruit and its "awakening" grants the user's rubber-like body increased strength and freedom, limited only by the user's imagination. It is for this reason that the user is said to become the "embodiment of freedom", able to bring joy to the people around them and making it "the most ridiculous power in the world". He also takes a completely white appearance. The World Government renamed it to erase the fruit's original name from history and reclassified it as a Paramecia in order to conceal its true nature. The fruit was originally a treasure sought by the World Government for over 800 years until it was stolen by Red-haired Shanks. According to the Five Elders, the fruit had not been awakened for centuries prior to Luffy's having done so.

Haki
Luffy has the ability to use . Luffy learns all those types of Haki and uses them with his improved attacks. As a result of his encounter with Magellan, he has also developed an immunity to poison (although it is shown that a strong poison may affect him, albeit very slowly). During his fight against Charlotte Katakuri, Luffy gains an advanced form of Observation Haki (Called Future Sight) to see several seconds into the future. During his time at Udon prison in Wano, Luffy gains two new advanced forms of Armament Haki. The first one is called Emission to shoot a short blast of Haki from a distance while the second one is called Internal Destruction which can also go inside his target's body or objects and destroy it from within. During his fight with Kaido at the top of Onigashima, Luffy unlocks an advanced form of Conquerors Haki. It is the ability to coat his entire body with it, similar to Armament Haki, which could further enhance his attacks.

Bounty
Luffy's first bounty is 30,000,000 Berries, which he receives after defeating Buggy, Don Krieg, and Arlong of East Blue. His second bounty is significantly higher, at 100,000,000 Berries, after defeating Crocodile of the Seven Warlords of the Sea. Luffy receives his third bounty of 300,000,000 Berries, after rampaging at Enies Lobby and retaking Nico Robin. His subsequent bounty of 400,000,000 Berries, is mainly given to him because of his defeat of another Warlord of the Sea, Gecko Moria, and his participation in the Summit War of Marineford. After the time skip, Luffy grows more powerful and receives a bounty of 500,000,000 Berries, after defeating a third Warlord, Donquixote Doflamingo. After defeating Charlotte Cracker and Charlotte Katakuri, two of the Big Mom Pirate's top-ranking members, with bounties of 800,000,000 and 1,057,000,000 Berries respectively, and having gone against Big Mom, one of the Four Emperors, he received a bounty of 1,500,000,000 Berries, one of the highest known bounties in the One Piece world. After Luffy defeated Kaido and Big Mom together with Kidd and Law, his bounty increased to 3,000,000,000 berries, and he became one of the Four Emperors in the New World.

Appearances

One Piece

Luffy first appears as a young boy in Windmill Village located in the Goa kingdom, who befriends the pirate "Red-Haired" Shanks and intends to become one himself. He accidentally eats the Human Human fruit, model: "Nika" fruit and acquires rubber powers at the cost of being unable to swim. Luffy is later saved at sea by Shanks from being devoured by a Sea King, a large sea beast, but costs Shanks his left arm due to it being eaten by the beast in the encounter. Ten years later, Luffy leaves the village in a small fishing boat in search of the legendary treasure 'One Piece' and to become King of the Pirates, while doing so he encounters the same Sea King that almost ate him 10 years ago, Luffy knocks it out in a single punch to avenge Shanks. He meets swordsman Roronoa Zoro, ocean navigator and thief Nami, cowardly marksman and liar Usopp, and chivalrous chef Sanji and invites them to join his crew. Luffy also encounters and defeats the East Blue pirate Buggy the Clown and the Fishman Arlong, becoming known to the general populace and the pirate-hating Marines, such as Captain Smoker.

The crew leaves the peaceful East Blue and enters the dangerous Grand Line on their ship, the Going Merry. He later accepts an offer to return Princess Nefertari Vivi of Alabasta to her homeland to stop a rebellion incited by Seven Warlords of the Sea member and Baroque Works crime syndicate leader Sir Crocodile. On the way, Nami nearly dies of an illness and the crew goes to find a doctor on the winter Drum Island, which was recently devastated by the Blackbeard Pirates. After Nami is healed, the reindeer doctor Tony Tony Chopper joins the Straw Hat crew. Upon arriving in Alabasta, Luffy briefly reunites with his brother Portgas D. Ace, a commander in the Whitebeard Pirates, who is hunting his former subordinate Blackbeard. After defeating Crocodile, the World Government hides the fact that pirates saved the kingdom. Luffy accepts Crocodile’s mysterious subordinate Nico Robin as the archeologist of his crew.

Robin's knowledge comes in handy as the crew ventures toward an island in the sky. Though the existence of Sky Islands is widely ridiculed, Luffy meets the pirate Blackbeard — but does not find out his name. Blackbeard encourages Luffy that Sky Islands do exist, and dreams of pirates never die. While visiting Skypiea, the crew is drawn into a four-hundred-year war over land. Luffy ends the war by defeating the god Eneru.

Upon landing back in the Blue Seas, the Going Merry is heavily damaged and Luffy seeks a shipwright to repair it. He meets Admiral Aokiji, who easily defeats him. Luffy learns about Robin's background and faces enemies connected to her on Water 7, the island with the best shipwrights in the world. Luffy's crew aligns with the cyborg shipwright Franky, initially an enemy, against the World Government intelligence agency Cipher Pol No. 9. Luffy and his crew save Robin and Franky from the government at Enies Lobby. After their fight with CP9, Luffy encounters his grandfather, Vice Admiral Monkey D. Garp. Garp tells him Shanks and Whitebeard are two of the Four Emperors, the most powerful pirates in the second half of the Grand Line. Luffy is surprised to learn from Garp that the leader of the Revolutionary Army which seeks to topple the World Government is Monkey D. Dragon, Luffy's father.

On the way to Fishman Island in their new ship, the Thousand Sunny, which Franky built, Luffy encounters the skeletal musician Brook. Brook accepts Luffy's offer to join the crew before declining since his shadow has been stolen. To return Brook's shadow, they defeat Warlord Gecko Moria, and Brook becomes Luffy's long-sought musician of the crew.

To enter Fishman Island, the crew takes a detour to the Sabaody Archipelago. Roger Pirates' First Mate, Silvers Rayleigh, is enlisted to coat the Thousand Sunny to enter the ocean depths under the Red Line, which marks the beginning of the second half of the Grand Line, known as the New World. By this time, Luffy has gained worldwide fame as a notorious rookie with bounties of over 100 million Berries; these rookies are known as Supernovas and include Zoro, Trafalgar Law, Eustass Kidd, and Capone "Gang" Bege. Yet Luffy, Zoro, and the rest of the Straw Hat Pirates are easily defeated by Admiral Kizaru after Luffy punches a World Noble, and Warlord Bartholomew Kuma sends the Straw Hat crew to separate parts of the world.

Stranded on Amazon Lily, an island ruled by the warlord Boa Hancock, Luffy impresses Hancock with his bravery and selflessness. Hancock falls in love with Luffy and brings him to the underground Impel Down prison to save his brother Ace, from execution after Ace was defeated by Blackbeard. Luffy breaks into the prison and meets previous foes and new allies, such as former Warlords Crocodile and Arlong's old captain Jimbei. Along with Buggy and members of the Revolutionary Army, Luffy frees the prisoners, but Ace is transferred to Marineford for his execution. Luffy and Buggy lead the prisoners into the war in Marineford between the navy and Whitebeard's forces. Ace gives his life to save Luffy from Admiral Akainu. A broken Luffy is evacuated with Jimbei from Marineford by Trafalgar Law.

Returning to Amazon Lily, Luffy remembers first meeting Ace; after Shanks left Windmill Village, Luffy's grandfather Garp left him in the care of his friend, the bandit Curly Dadan. Luffy befriends Ace and Sabo, who are like brothers to him, but Sabo is seemingly killed by a World Noble. After returning to Marineford to send a hidden message to his crew, Luffy trains with Rayleigh on Ruskaina Island to become stronger.

Two years later, the Straw Hats reunite and finally make it to Fishman Island. Luffy and the others meet Jimbei and the island's princess, Shirahoshi, and are drawn into a battle for the island against the Fishman supremacist Hody Jones. He, the crew, and Jimbei conceive a plan to defeat Hody and his henchmen in a way that will alleviate racial tensions between humans and fish-men. After Hody's defeat, Jimbei promises to join the crew at a later date and Fishman Island seeks to join the Reverie summit of human kings, held every four years. Luffy learns Akainu was promoted to Fleet Admiral and Blackbeard replaced Whitebeard as one of the Four Emperors. Luffy begins a feud with Emperor Big Mom over control of Fishman Island. The crew leaves the ocean depths and enters the secret New World island, Punk Hazard.

Upon arriving at Punk Hazard, half of the crew is captured by Caesar Clown, a jealous rival of the scientist Vegapunk and a subordinate of the Warlord and underworld broker Donquixote Doflamingo. Luffy and his crew ally with Trafalgar Law, now a Warlord, who plans to kidnap Caesar as part of a plan to take down Emperor Kaido. Samurai from the Wano Country, Kinemon, and Momonosuke join the alliance to venture to Dressrosa, the kingdom ruled by Doflamingo.

With Caesar hostage, the alliance lands on Dressrosa, where Luffy enters a tournament to win Ace's Devil Fruit. Here he finds out that Sabo is still alive and is part of the Revolutionary Army. Sabo wins the tournament, and with Luffy's blessing, Sabo consumes Ace's Devil Fruit. Due to the machinations of Doflamingo, some of the crew is forced to leave for the island of Zou. Luffy and the rest of the crew are forced to fight for their lives when they stumble on the truth of Doflamingo's operations, who attempts to kill everyone in Dressrosa to keep the truth of his rule hidden. With the aid of his fellow competitors in the tournament, Luffy defeats Doflamingo. In the aftermath, seven pirate crews pledge their loyalty to Luffy, despite his protests, marking the formation of the Straw Hat Grand Fleet.

Afterward, the remaining crew and their friends are transported by their new subordinates to Zou and learn it was devastated by the forces of Emperor Kaido. Luffy also learns that Sanji, who was part of the group that heads to Zou first, had been blackmailed by his family to agree to an arranged marriage to the daughter of Emperor Big Mom. The crew learns from the Mink Tribe about the Road Poneglyphs and their connection to the final island Laugh Tale, where the One Piece is. An alliance between the Samurai, Mink, Straw Hats and Law is made to defeat Kaido, who is revealed to rule over Wano via a puppet Shogun.

Being forewarned going to Wano, Luffy, and half the crew, along with the Mink warriors Pedro and Carrot, infiltrate Big Mom's territory Tottoland both to retrieve Sanji and copy the writing on the Road Poneglyph that Big Mom has in her possession. Luffy and Sanji learn the wedding is a set-up to murder Sanji's family for their advanced technology, while Brook steals a printing of the Road Poneglyph. Big Mom's subordinates Jimbei and Bege betray her and Luffy and Sanji enact a failed assassination attempt on Big Mom at the wedding, in front of the press. Jimbei joins the crew but is temporarily left behind as the rest of the crew barely escapes from Big Mom's territory. Luffy defeats two of Big Mom's three generals and his bounty skyrockets.

After the fight with Big Mom, Luffy becomes a hot topic at the Reverie, a global summit of rulers of fifty nations in Mary Geoise, the capital of the World Government above the Red Line. Most view him as a dangerous madman, but the kings of Sakura, Alabasta, Fishman Island, Dressrosa, and Prodence, secretly favor Luffy since he saved them from tyranny. Meanwhile, Luffy and the others are separated entering the Wano Country. Luffy reunites with Zoro before meeting with the rest of the crew and alliance. Luffy challenges Emperor Kaido but is defeated and thrown in prison alongside fellow Supernova Eustass Kidd. There, he meets Hyogoro of the flower and trains under him, learning a new form of armament Haki that will enable him to damage Kaido. They later escape the prison and plan to attack the Island of 'Onigashima' which Kaido and his crew currently occupy. Luffy along with his crew allied with Trafalgar Law, Eustass Kid and the 9 retainers of Kozuki Oden, charge for the Island to beat Kaido and free the country of Wano. During the battle, he faces Kaido, and after several rounds in which Luffy ends up at his limits, he ends up awakening the power of his Devil Fruit, thanks to which he can defeat the Emperor of the Sea. Because of this, a week later of the events Luffy happens to be considered one of the Four Emperors.

In other media
Luffy has appeared in every One Piece licensed electronic video game to date, including Jump Super Stars and Jump Ultimate Stars, and is featured in the 2006 Dragon Ball Z-One Piece-Naruto crossover game Battle Stadium D.O.N. Luffy, Son Goku and Naruto Uzumaki were avatars in the MMORPG Second Life for a Jump Festa promotion, "Jumpland@Second Life". Luffy has also been mentioned in songs. He sings about being a wanted pirate in "Wanted!" and about One Piece in "Every-One Piece!" Luffy is a major playable character in the crossover game, J-Stars Victory VS. Luffy and several other characters joined the cast of Dragon Ball in a spinoff entitled Cross Epoch. On April 3, 2011, Luffy and the other One Piece protagonists appeared in the first episode of the Toriko anime series and the crossover manga chapter. Luffy made a cameo appearance in a Weekly Shonen Jump episode of To Love-Ru, and the Gum-Gum was mentioned in the 50th episode of the Gin Tama anime series.

Luffy will be portrayed by Iñaki Godoy in Netflix’s live action adaptation of One Piece.

Reception

Critical reception
According to Funimation Entertainment's Mike McFarland and Christopher Sabat, Luffy was more likable than Dragon Ball Son Goku. Joe McCulloch preferred Luffy to Naruto Uzumaki from Naruto because Luffy "work[ed] his ass off" to achieve his goals after accidentally acquiring his powers. Luffy has been praised in a number of publications. T.H.E.M. Anime Reviews called Luffy "likabl[y] goofy" and an idealist with infectious optimism. In a review of One Piece The Movie: Dead End no Bōken, the fourth One Piece film, The Star Online described him as "an airhead and brilliant fighter". Rika Takahashi of EX wrote that Luffy's stretching powers set One Piece apart from "the old stereotypical adventure manga" and the many other "combat-oriented ", making the series "something new and interesting". Anime News Network (ANN) writer Zac Bertschy found Luffy reminiscent of Rurouni Kenshin character Himura Kenshin in personality and attitude, but still thought him entertaining. Mania Entertainment's Bryce Coulter called Luffy a "great shonen hero". ANN's Carl Kimlinger wrote, "Colleen Clinkenbeard's Luffy continues to grow on you".

Popularity
Luffy ranked first in all of One Piece Characters Official Popularity Poll. The only main protagonists that achieved ranked first in all of their correspondent popularity polls are Luffy and Gintoki Sakata. On The 1st Global One Piece Characters Popularity Poll, the latest official popularity poll of One Piece in which more than 12 million voted from all over the world, Luffy topped the list having total votes of 1,637,921.

NTT customers chose Luffy as their second-favorite black-haired male anime character. The Gum-Gum Gatling technique topped the male category in a Japanese survey of the most popular moves in manga and anime.  Luffy was even nominated in the Best Male Character category for the 2008 Society for the Promotion of Japanese Animation Awards. He ranked 22nd on Chris Mackenzie's IGN list of top-25 anime characters of all time. In a Japanese TV special from August 2017, Luffy was voted as the 8th "strongest hero" from the Showa Era as well as the 4th one from the Heisei Era.

Luffy had appeared in magazines, Japanese television shows, manga etc. Luffy was the first manga character that had been on the cover in the Men's Non-No fashion magazine's 24-year history and his clothes were designed by Shinichi "Miter" Mita. He also appeared in the cover of a famous fashion magazine, ELLE MEN together with Roronoa Zoro after the collaboration between One Piece and Gucci. He had appeared in CGI in the semi-annual live-action television series Yo nimo Kimyō na Monogatari (Tales of the Unusual) for the celebration of the series's 25th anniversary. He appeared together with the Japanese actor and model Hiroshi Abe. Costumed character version of Luffy together with Goku appeared at the 39th International Emmy Awards Gala in New York and they stood on stage for presentation of the Children & Young People Award, won by the Chilean Children's program ¿Con Qué Sueñas? (What is your Dream?). In the final chapter of Naruto, Boruto Uzumaki makes a drawing of Luffy as a legacy of him and the series. In a Weekly Shonen Jump manga, Tsugihagi Hyouryuu Sakka (a character resembling Luffy) says, "Instead of saying what you hate, say what you like!". In the One Piece manga, Luffy cited but changed it to "Instead of saying what you like, say what you hate!" The meme was acknowledged in the crossover fighting game, J-Stars Victory VS. Toei Animation sponsored the Italian Pallavolo Modena volleyball team in 2008; Pietro Rinaldi and Edoardo Ciabattini's black uniforms were decorated with an image of Luffy on the front.

Takashi Kawamura, mayor of Nagoya City in Japan, had cosplayed Luffy in the 10th World Cosplay Summit in which 40 cosplayers from 20 countries and regions all over the world were competing. Also, the famous Japanese actress and model Kanna Hashimoto had cosplayed Luffy in the celebration of One Piece's manga 18th anniversary. She dressed up as Luffy (albeit in a feminine reinterpretation) for Weekly Shonen Jump's combined 37-38 issue.

Miltiadis Tentoglou of Greece posed Luffy's Gear Second during his entrance before the Long Jump finals on Tokyo Olympics 2020 and won Gold Medal. Another, Major League Soccer player Nicolas Benezet imitated Luffy's Gear Second pose after scoring a goal on Sunday night in his first match with Seattle Sounders FC. China's most popular actor Xiao Zhan stated on his interview that he wanted to be like Luffy. He admired Luffy because, "he had been working hard to realize his ideals and despite always facing difficulties he never give up".

Notes

References

External links 

 Monkey D. Luffy's bio at One Pieces official website 

Adoptee characters in anime and manga
Fictional orphans
Anime and manga characters who can move at superhuman speeds
Anime and manga characters with accelerated healing
Anime and manga characters with superhuman strength
Martial artist characters in anime and manga
Comics characters introduced in 1997
Fictional characters who can stretch themselves
Fictional characters with disfigurements
Fictional characters with post-traumatic stress disorder
Fictional characters with superhuman durability or invulnerability
Fictional sea pirates
Fictional sea captains
Fictional treasure hunters
Brazilian people of Romanian descent
Fictional prison escapees
Male characters in anime and manga
One Piece characters
Shapeshifter characters in comics
Teenage characters in anime and manga
Vigilante characters in comics